Robert D. Reber Jr. (born July 19, 1947) is a former Republican member of the Pennsylvania House of Representatives.

References

Republican Party members of the Pennsylvania House of Representatives
Living people
1947 births